Longoni is a village in the commune of Koungou on Mayotte.

This village is known in particular due to its commercial port which is the only one in Mayotte.

Populated places in Mayotte